Russet Pikes are Antarctic peaks just east of the mouth of Gaul Cove on Horseshoe Island. Surveyed by Falkland Islands Dependencies Survey (FIDS) in 1955–57. The name is descriptive; reddish-brown colour is visible on the feature most of the year, the slopes being too steep to retain snow cover for any length of time.
 

Mountains of Graham Land
Fallières Coast